Nomad: The Warrior is a 2005 Kazakh historical epic film written and co-produced by Rustam Ibragimbekov, executive-produced by Miloš Forman and directed by Sergei Bodrov, Ivan Passer and Talgat Temenov. It was released on March 16, 2007 in North America, distributed by The Weinstein Company. Two versions of the film were shot: one in Kazakh by Temenov for distribution in Kazakhstan and one in English by Passer and Bodrov for distribution worldwide. The government of Kazakhstan invested $40 million in the film production, making it the most expensive Kazakh film ever made. Nomad was Kazakhstan's official entry for Best Foreign Language Film for the 79th Academy Awards. It was also the last film that Passer directed before his death in 2020.

Plot

Nomad is a historical epic set in 18th-century Kazakhstan. The film is a fictionalized account of the youth and coming-of-age of Ablai Khan, a Khan of the Kazakh Horde, as he grows and fights to defend the fortress at Hazrat-e Turkestan from Dzungar invaders during the Kazakh-Dzungar Wars.

Cast
 Kuno Becker as Mansur
 Jay Hernandez as Erali
 Jason Scott Lee as Oraz the Wise
 Ayan Yesmagambetova as Gaukhar
 Mark Dacascos as Sharish
 Archie Kao as Shangrek
 Tungyshbay Jamanqulov as Abilqair
 Doskhan Joljaqsynov as Galdan Ceren
 Yerik Joljaqsynov as Barak
 Dilnaz Akhmadieva as Hocha
 Azis Beyshinaliev as Ragbat

Release dates
The Kazakh language version of Nomad premiered in Kazakhstan on 6 July 2005.

The film was released in the United States on March 16, 2007 (limited release) and March 30, 2007 (wide release).

І том “Алмас қылыш”
(баспа “Шығыс-Батыс”, София, 2006)

ІІ том “Жанталас”
(баспа “Шығыс-Батыс”, София, 2007)

ІІІ том “Хан Кене”
(баспа “Шығыс-Батыс”, София, 2008)

Reception

On Metacritic, the film has a weighted average score of 49 out of 100, based on 7 critics, indicating "mixed or average reviews".

Variety critic Leslie Felperin, who viewed the film at the Locarno Film Festival wrote that, "nearly every tenge (Kazakhstan's local currency) and euro from French-based co-production partner Wild Bunch is visible on screen, judging by pic's elaborate costumes, sets and cast of a thousand or so — real people not digitally generated extras", and that co-directors "Passer and Bodrov, assisted by (per credits) 'local director' Talgat Temenov, have enough skill to make Nomad compelling by dint of old-school sincerity and sheer spectacle. [...] [the cast shows] the necessary displays of athletic prowess and toothsome looks, particularly from the virile Becker".

In the United States, it was a box office bomb, as the film was only able to scrape $79,123. While most of the critics enjoyed the cinematography and the action scenes, they criticized the film for rudimentary acting, confused directing and, for some critics who saw the English version, poor dubbing. The critics especially noted that the film had very poor screenwriting, for lines such as a scene between Mansur (Kuno Becker) and Gauhar (Ayan Yesmagambetova):
Mansur: 'You have the scent of the moon.'
Gauhar: 'Does the moon have a scent?'

Awards and nominations
In addition to being Kazakhstan's entry in the race for the Academy Award for Best Foreign Language Film, Carlo Siliotto received a Golden Globe Award nomination for Best Original Score.

See also
List of most expensive non-English language films
List of historical drama films of Asia
Ten Great Campaigns
Dzungar Khanate
Kazakh Khanate
Kazakh-Dzungar Wars

References

External links
 
 
 
 Universcinema.com 
 OutNow! Movie Review 

2005 films
Kazakhstani war drama films
Russian historical adventure films
Kazakh-language films
2000s Russian-language films
2000s historical adventure films
Films shot in Kazakhstan
War epic films
War adventure films
Films set in the 18th century
Films set in Kazakhstan
2000s biographical films
Films directed by Sergei Bodrov
Films produced by Ram Bergman
Russian multilingual films
2005 multilingual films
Films directed by Ivan Passer
Films scored by Carlo Siliotto
Kazakhstani historical drama films